The men's 100 metres T20 took place at the Stadium Australia.

The T20 category is for athletes who have an intellectual disability such as autism. The race consisted of three heats and the seven fastest runners competed in the final.

Results

Heat 1

Heat 2

Heat 3

Final

References

Athletics at the 2000 Summer Paralympics